Lubāna Municipality was a municipality in Vidzeme, Latvia. The municipality was formed in 2007 by merging Indrāni Parish and Lubāna town, the administrative centre being Lubāna.

On 1 July 2021, Lubāna Municipality ceased to exist and its territory was merged into Madona Municipality.

See also 
 Administrative divisions of Latvia (2009)

References 

 
Former municipalities of Latvia